Nad Al Miqsar (formerly known as Al Rafisah) is an abandoned settlement West of Khor Fakkan in Sharjah, United Arab Emirates (UAE). 

A traditional village at the head of the Wadi Shie, which is dammed by the Al Rafisah Dam, Nad Al Miqsar has been restored as a heritage village following the construction of the Sharjah-Khor Fakkan highway and the dam and associated rest area that were developed as part of the Dhs5.5 billion highway project. The fort at Najd Al Miqsar formed part of a connected series of fortifications protecting Khor Fakkan, including the Al Rabi Tower and the Al Adwani Tower.

References

Populated places in the Emirate of Sharjah